Sandrina Buenatelue António (born 5 October 1997), known as Sandrinha, is an Angolan footballer who plays as a goalkeeper for GD Sagrada Esperança and the Angola women's national team.

Club career
Sandrinha has played for Sagrada Esperança in Angola.

International career
Sandrinha capped for Angola at senior level during the 2021 COSAFA Women's Championship.

References

1997 births
Living people
Angolan women's footballers
Women's association football goalkeepers
G.D. Sagrada Esperança players
Angola women's international footballers